Pouran Jinchi (born 1959 in Mashhad, Iran) is an Iranian-American, New York-based artist. She is best known for her abstract, calligraphy-based contemporary visual art.

Biography
Pouran Jinchi borrows from her Iranian cultural traditions of literature and calligraphy to pursue her own aesthetic investigations. Trained as a calligrapher in Mashad, Iran, Jinchi received a Bachelor of Science, Civil Engineering, from George Washington University, Washington, DC in 1982, before studying Sculpture and Painting, University of California, Los Angeles, California in 1989 and Studio Painting, Art Students League of New York, New York City in 1993.

Jinchi's work often employs a mixture of calligraphy and abstract expressionism that intertwines Islamic geometry, Iranian traditions and contemporary aesthetics, with a unique lyricism. Her early Poetry paintings are both abstract and literal presentations of poems in which texts are morphed beyond recognition into flowing, anthropomorphic shapes. Having been trained in calligraphy, she finds the relation between words and forms, natural or non-objective, deeply intertwined. Jinchi's recent work reflects an increasingly detailed focus on the form of language as subject matter. Her calligraphy work is in Persian, but deconstructed and ineligible to read, even for native Persian-speakers.

Jinchi has exhibited extensively and has had eight solo exhibitions in New York alone. Recent exhibitions include a two-person show at Frieze Art Fair, London (2011) and solo exhibitions at Art Projects International, New York (2012), The Third Line, Dubai (2010), the Leila Heller Gallery, New York (2011), and the Vilcek Foundation, New York (2008).

Her work has also been exhibited at the Asian Art Museum of San Francisco, Herbert F. Johnson Museum of Art, Museum of Fine Arts, Houston, Brooklyn Museum and the Queens Museum of Art. Jinchi was included in Iran Inside Out at the Chelsea Art Museum (2009) and most recently in New Blue and White at the Museum of Fine Arts, Boston (2013).

Her work is represented in major collections including the Metropolitan Museum of Art, New York; Museum of Fine Arts Houston; Herbert F. Johnson Museum of Art, New York; Farjam Collection, Dubai; Brooklyn Museum, New York; Arthur M. Sackler Gallery, Smithsonian Institution, Washington DC; Federal Reserve Bank, New York; and several major corporate collections.

See also
 Islamic art
 Iranian art
 Islamic calligraphy
 List of Iranian artists
List of Iranian women artists

References

External links 
 Pouran Jinchi — artist's website
Art Projects International: Pouran Jinchi artist page
Media Farzin: ArteEast
The Third Line gallery

1959 births
Living people
20th-century Iranian women artists
21st-century Iranian women artists
Iranian contemporary artists
Iranian calligraphers
Iranian women painters
Artists from New York City
Iranian emigrants to the United States
George Washington University School of Engineering and Applied Science alumni
UCLA School of the Arts and Architecture alumni
Art Students League of New York alumni
People from Mashhad
Women calligraphers
American artists of Iranian descent